Symphonica (also promoted as Symphonica: The Orchestral Tour) was an orchestral concert tour by George Michael and his last tour. The singer performed the songs mainly from Songs from the Last Century and Patience albums as well as some cover versions in new arrangements.

Background
The tour was officially announced on 11 May 2011. Due to high demand for tickets, extra shows were added in Dublin, London, Birmingham, Manchester, Glasgow, Cardiff, Rotterdam, Herning & Verona. A Brussels show was later announced on 3 June. Milan and Copenhagen shows were later announced.

A "Songs From The Last Century-Tour", with most of the songs that appear on Symphonica, was actually planned around the release of its album, but the idea was shelved until after the hugely well received and successful "25-Tour".

Many of the shows had already sold out completely. Prague, Antwerp, Rotterdam, London (Royal Albert Hall & Royal Opera House), Dublin, Cardiff, Sheffield and Newcastle had all sold out.

The Show included four new core band members who were selected by producer Phil Ramone and George Michael.   These new members included musical director and pianist Henry Hey, guitarist Ben Butler, bassist David Finck, and drummer Mark McLean.  In addition, percussionist Lea Mullen and guitarist Phil Palmer completed the band – along with Michael's long-time background vocalists Shirley Lewis, Lucy Jules, Lincoln Jean-Marie and Jay Henry. Stage has a semi-oval shape with a huge screen projecting different visual effects sometimes with George himself. Some visuals were taken from previous tour.

On 25 November it was announced that all further concerts in 2011 had been cancelled due to ill health. Eventually it took longer time for George to recover thus all concerts postponed and scheduled for April and May would be postponed to October and November 2012.

On 3 May 2012 it was announced that scheduled for early April shows in Australia would be postponed to November 2012. His performance in Perth on 10 November would've been the headline act for the Perth Arena Gala Opening. But later due to recovery restrictions from the illness, George was forced to cancel all Australian dates.

It was announced on Michael's website that his album Symphonica, released on 17 March 2014, would consist of studio material initially rehearsed for this tour including some live recordings.

Opening acts
Wrocław Philharmonic Orchestra (Poland)
Czech National Symphony Orchestra (Prague)

Setlist
The set list of the premiere concert on 22 August 2011 at State Opera House – Prague, Czech Republic
Set list has a few changes from the first concert – see Additional notes.
 "Through"
 "My Baby Just Cares For Me"
 "Cowboys & Angels"
 "True Faith"
 "Let Her Down Easy" (Terence Trent D'Arby cover)
 "Kissing A Fool"
 "Going to a Town"
 "Roxanne"
 "It Doesn’t Really Matter"
 "Brother Can You Spare a Dime?" Intermission
 "Patience"
 "John And Elvis Are Dead"
 "Russian Roulette"
 "You Have Been Loved"
 "You've Changed"
 "Love Is A Losing Game"
 "Where I Hope You Are" (new)
 "Praying For Time"
 "Wild Is the Wind"
 "A Different Corner"
 "Feeling Good"
 "You And I" Encore
 "Amazing" / "I'm Your Man" / "Freedom 90"

Additional notes

Closer to the end of Intermission a mix of different Michael's songs including "A Different Corner", "Older" and "John and Elvis Are Dead" is playing with some light effects.
From 3 September concert at Forum Copenhagen George includes the song "Understand" in the set-list replacing "You And I".
On 17 September, George Michael performed a concert to celebrate the opening of a new stadium in Wrocław. He performed with the Wrocław Philharmonic Orchestra.
From 19 September concert at Budapest Sportaréna George perform Elton John' song "Idol" replacing "It Doesn't Really Matter".
From 7 October concert at Antwerp SportPaleis George perform "Song To The Siren" replacing "Understand".
George Michael performed the song "Safe" on 29 October concert in London's Royal Albert Hall, 1 and 3 November concerts in Dublin's The O2
From 14 November concert at Prague O2Arena George perform the song "The Recluse" replacing "Kissing a Fool".
During the second leg of the tour in 2012 the songs "Idol", "Song To The Siren", "You and I" and "Where I Hope You Are" was removed, the song "Father Figure" added to the first half of the set-list, the first song after the intermission is changed to "Waiting For That Day" and "Love is a Losing Game" was not performed as well. Additionally, the last song performed live was "White Light".
On 16 September concert in Birmingham George finished the concert with the song "I Remember You" instead of "White Light"
On 9 October concert in Manchester, George finished the concert with the song "I Remember You" instead of "White Light" and performed "Star People" and "F.E.A.R" by Ian Brown.
At concert in Liverpool and final shows in London George would finish the concert with "I Remember You".

Shows 

Cancellations and rescheduled shows

References

External links

Official Tour Page
George Michael Concert Archive

2011 concert tours
2012 concert tours
George Michael concert tours
Orchestral music